John Cragg Callion is a British ornithologist. His 25-year study of the European stonechat and his findings on the Eurasian dotterel have revealed much previously unknown information about both species.

Biography

John Callion was born on 14 September 1946 in Workington, Cumbria. He developed an interest in birds while still at school, and has devoted over 50 years to the study of birds, in particular the European stonechat, the Eurasian dotterel, the whinchat and the wood warbler.

Callion has been an active member of the British Trust for Ornithology since 1973 and was formerly its representative in Cumbria. He was a founder member of the Cumbria Bird Club, the Cumbria ornithological society, which was established in 1989 and he was elected its first chairman.

He has written numerous papers on birds and bird-life. He is the co-author of The Breeding Birds of Cumbria - A Tetrad Atlas 1997-2001.

Bernard Tucker medal

Callion received the 1996 Bernard Tucker Medal, named after the noted ornithologist Bernard Tucker and awarded annually for outstanding services to ornithology by the British Trust for Ornithology.

25-year study of the European stonechat

Callion published the results of his 25-year study of the European stonechat in British Birds in November 2015. He carried out his research at close quarters in the field in his native Cumbria, and in France and Spain.

His study has gained him recognition as an authority on the European stonechat. In an article in The Times entitled Stonechats' secrets revealed, the British naturalist, author and former Man Booker Prize judge Derwent May hailed Callion's findings and revelations as 'splendid contributions to knowledge', and said:

"He has found 1,300 nests and put coloured rings on the legs of numerous nestlings to follow the story of their lives...

Callion describes, as never before, the light-hearted way in which the female takes her incubation duties at first, coming off the eggs every hour and stopping to preen casually, before going back. However, she becomes more and more frenetic, and by the time the eggs are about to hatch, she is incubating for three hours unbroken and coming off to feed for only three minutes..."

In 2022 Callion published research on nest site selection from further studies of the European stonechat.

Eurasian dotterel report

Callion has also carried out a comprehensive study of the Eurasian dotterel along the lines of his European stonechat research. In 2015, his findings and reflections were published in Lakeland Naturalist, the Cumbrian naturalist journal. in 2018, A history of the Dotterel in Cumbria, coauthored with John Strowger was published in the Transactions of Carlisle Natural History Society. This 125th Anniversary edition also featured Callion's article on the Eurasian reed warbler written with Pete Davies.

Cumbrian birds

Recent publications are based on the extensive data and observation Callion and his team have collected over 6 decades in Cumbria, this research has detailed the behaviour of several species over a long period. The Timing and orientation of post-nesting migration of Cumbrian Sedge Warblers, Nesting Grasshopper Warblers in West Cumbria,  Phylloscopus Warblers in the Keswick area, and Rock Pipits in Cumbria, . Callion's research on the relationship between weight, wingspan and migration in blackbirds was published in British Birds.

References

1946 births
English ornithologists
British Trust for Ornithology people
Ornithology
Living people